The Ramakrishna Ashram Marg Metro Station is located on the Blue Line of the Delhi Metro.

Station layout

Facilities
List of available ATM at Ramakrishna Ashram Marg metro station

Gallery

Connections
After Phase 4, this station will be an interchange point of the blue and magenta lines, along with Janakpuri West and Botanical Garden stations.

See also
List of Delhi Metro stations
Transport in Delhi
Delhi Metro Rail Corporation
Delhi Suburban Railway
List of rapid transit systems in India

References

External links

 Delhi Metro Rail Corporation Ltd. (Official site)
 Delhi Metro Annual Reports
 
 UrbanRail.Net – descriptions of all metro systems in the world, each with a schematic map showing all stations.

Delhi Metro stations
Railway stations opened in 2005
Railway stations in New Delhi district